Hailey Gates is an American model, actress, director, and journalist. She hosted the Viceland series States of Undress.

Early life
Gates grew up in the Los Angeles area, where her family has resided for seven generations.

Career

The Paris Review
Upon her graduation from New York University in 2012, Gates began working as an editor and director of advertising at The Paris Review. She left the magazine in 2015.

Modeling
Gates has starred in campaigns for Miu Miu (by Steve Meisel), Costume National, and Target. She also appeared on the July/August 2011 cover of Jalouse magazine. She is currently signed to M Model Management.

Film
Gates appeared in Ricki and the Flash as Emily in 2015. She also co-wrote and produced A Space Program, a 2015 docudrama, with artist Tom Sachs. The film received a positive review from The New York Times.

In January 2019, a short film directed by Gates and starring Alia Shawkat, Shako Mako, premiered in Los Angeles. The film is part of the Women's Tales series created Miu Miu.

In 2019, Gates appeared in the Safdie brothers' movie, Uncut Gems.

Television 
Gates hosted Viceland's States of Undress. The investigative docu-series focuses on the political and social circumstances surrounding fashion weeks around the world. The show's second season premiered on June 6, 2017.

Gates had a small role as "drugged-out mother" in David Lynch's 2017 reboot of Twin Peaks on Showtime.

Personal 
Gates' maternal grandmother is screenwriter Joan Tewkesbury. Her great grandfather was the first mayor of Santa Monica. Gates' parents separated during her childhood.

In 2012, Gates graduated with a Bachelor of Fine Arts in experimental theater from the Tisch School of the Arts at New York University.

As of May 2016, Gates resides on the Upper West Side of New York City.

References

External links
 
 Viceland: States of Undress

Year of birth missing (living people)
Living people
Female models from California
Tisch School of the Arts alumni
Place of birth missing (living people)
Actresses from California